Baron  was a Japanese statesman, active in Meiji period Japan. He was the first Director of the Hokkaidō Agency from January 26, 1886 through June 15, 1888.

Biography
Iwamura was born in Kōchi as the eldest son to a samurai family serving the Tosa Domain. He studied swordsmanship under Okada Izō. During the Boshin War of the Meiji Restoration, he fought under the imperial banner, in the Battle of Hokuetsu in 1868-1869.

In July 1874, Iwamura was appointed governor of Saga Prefecture. Coming shortly after the Saga Rebellion, this was regarded as a hardship posting. In 1876, he was reported to the Yamaguchi Prefecture regional office, where he coordinated central government preparations in the Satsuma Rebellion. He was appointed governor of Kagoshima Prefecture, in which capacity he supervised the funeral ceremonies for Saigō Takamori. As a reward for his services, he returned to Tokyo as a member of the Genrōin and Chairman of the Board of Audit. From April to December 1883, he served as the 3rd Governor of Okinawa Prefecture.

After serving in Okinawa for two years, Iwamura was reassigned to the other end of Japan, serving as first Director of the Hokkaidō Agency from January 26, 1886 through June 15, 1888. During his time in Hokkaidō, he supervised the completion of the Hokkaidō Agency HQ in Sapporo, and strongly promoted the development of Asahikawa. He then returned to Tokyo, where he held the post of chairman of the Genrōin from June 14, 1888 to October 20, 1890. He was selected to serve as Minister of Agriculture and Commerce under the 1st Yamagata administration from December 24, 1889 to May 17, 1890.

On June 5, 1896, Iwamura was awarded the title of viscount (shishaku) under the kazoku peerage system, and received the Grand Cordon of the Order of the Sacred Treasure later the same year. He served as an advisor to Emperor Meiji, and was appointed to a seat in the House of Peers. He was also awarded the Order of the Rising Sun, 1st class on June 23, 1904. He died in Tokyo on February 12, 1915, and his grave is at the Yanaka Cemetery in Tokyo.

References
Weiner, Michael (2004). Race, Ethnicity and Migration in Modern Japan. (London: Routledge), p. 231.

Samurai
1840 births
1915 deaths
People from Tosa Domain
Kazoku
People of the Boshin War
People of Meiji-period Japan
Members of the House of Peers (Japan)
Recipients of the Order of the Rising Sun
Government ministers of Japan
Governors of Okinawa Prefecture
Governors of Saga Prefecture
Governors of Kagoshima Prefecture